Pinacoplus is a genus of owlet moths in the family Noctuidae. This genus has a single species, Pinacoplus didymogramma.

References

Natural History Museum Lepidoptera genus database

Hadeninae